The Extraordinary and Plenipotentiary Ambassador of Austria to Peru is the official representative of the Republic of Austria to the Republic of Peru. The ambassador in Lima is also accredited to Bolivia.

Both countries established relations in the 19th century. In 1851, Austria-Hungary recognized the independence of Peru, and both countries subsequently established relations. By 1859, ethnic Germans from Austria and Germany established and founded the colony of Pozuzo.

As a result of World War I, Peru severed relations with both Germany and Austria-Hungary, reestablishing them with the First Austrian Republic after the war. After the incorporation of Austria into the German Reich in 1938, Peru ceased to have relations with Austria, instead continuing its relations with Germany until 1942. During this period, the Austrian population in Peru saw itself polarized between Austrian loyalists and National Socialists.

In 1947, Peru recognized the Republic of Austria, and in 1949, bilateral relations were resumed, being elevated to embassy level in 1968.

List of representatives

Austria-Hungary

Austria

See also
List of ambassadors of Peru to Austria

References

Peru
Austria